{{DISPLAYTITLE:C18H22O}}
The molecular formula C18H22O (molar mass: 254.37 g/mol, exact mass: 254.1671 u) may refer to:

 Enzacamene (4-MBC)
 Estratetraenol, or estra-1,3,5(10),16-tetraen-3-ol